is a Japanese manga series by Una Megurogawa. It has been serialized in Tokuma Shoten's seinen manga magazine Monthly Comic Zenon, as well as the webmagazine Web Comic Zenyon, since June 2014 and has been collected in tenth tankōbon volumes. An anime television series adaptation by Studio Signpost premiered from January 10 to March 27, 2020.

Characters

The former lord of Owari, Nobunaga was betrayed by his subordinate, Akechi Mitsuhide, and, in his final words, would be amused to be reborn as a dog. His wish ends up coming true as he is reborn as a Shiba Inu of the Oda household. He is still vexed at some modern portrayals of him being a literal fool at Honnoji. Because of his former nickname being the "Fool of Owari", he particularly hates the mention of words like "fool", "stupid" or "idiot" as well as fire as it reminds him of Honnōji. He still uses the archaic "de aru" when speaking.

Previously the lord of Oshu, Masamune was reborn as a French Bulldog. In the place of his eyepatch is a large black spot around his right eye, and the crescent on his helmet is now placed right under his neck. His owner is a fan of a male idol group that is named after his various swords and other Date-related groups and media. He is unhappy with Yukimura's flippant behaviour due to modern media portraying both of them as friends and rivals. Out of all the lords, Masamune is the most taken to the modern surroundings, most especially with its entertainment.

A Pomeranian that was formerly the lord of Kai, his fluff tail is something transferred from the fur surrounding his helmet. He often meets his rival, Kenshin, near the Kawanakajima household. He enjoys his life as a dog since his small stature allows him to see under the skirts of women. On occasion, he will often quote the Fūrinkazan.

The lord of Echigo and Shingen's rival, Kenshin was reborn as a Borzoi. He often has stare downs with Shingen near the house of the Kawanakajima family. He remains heavily prideful over his legacy with some of his possessions being preserved as cultural treasures. One of his main regrets in his previous life is his sexual abstinence due to his upbringing in a temple. He uses the verbal tic "-zoi" at the end of sentences.

The former lord of Suruga, he was killed by Nobunaga during the Battle of Okehazama and was reborn as a Dachshund. He bears no grudge towards Nobunaga and is rather taken in by the pampered life he gets as a dog. He dislikes his modern portrayals as a bumbling oaf due to his final loss and death.

Once one of the most feared strategists of the Warring States period, Kanbei was reincarnated as a Toy Poodle. He remains highly knowledgable of the events and trends of the modern era but can be rather savvy to the prospect of having these concepts in their era.

A Corgi that was formerly Sanada Yukimura, who was known for his heroics during the Siege of Osaka. He enjoys poking fun and teasing the older lords. Happy to be alive compared to the brutal lifestyle he had, he has a bad habit of laughing too much. Masamune noted that Yukimura's personality was much more different in their previous lives, but it changed drastically in the transition to being a dog.

Owner of Cinnamon, not knowing he is Nobunaga reborn. Her name is a reference to Nobunaga's sister, Oichi. She falls in love with Mitsu at first sight, and mistakes his gazes for her, failing to notice that they are directed to Nobunaga. She is known by her family and friends to be rather gluttonous. 

Voiced by: Hiroki Nanami
A man that is obsessed with petting and spending time with Cinnamon. He bears a striking resemblance to Mitsuhide during his past life. Mitsu's nickname is also Mitsuhide, and he is noted for his love of milk, to the point where he does nothing but drink milk exclusively.

The former lord of Yamato, Hisahide overthrew his previous master, and eventually killed himself by blowing himself up with teapots filled with gunpowder in defiance to Nobunaga. Hisahide was reincarnated as a Chihuahua and is known to constantly shiver and shake uncontrollably. He is a huge fan of rock music, and is a surprisingly good singer despite being otherwise insane. Like Shingen, Hisahide is perverted and uses his petite appearance to gain advantages over girls, leading to competition from Shingen.

The former queen of France, in her previous life, she was killed and was reborn as a female Dachshund, who is now married to Yoshimoto. Like Yoshimoto, she is unhappy with her modern portrayals showing her to be more ignorant than she actually is. Yoshimoto notes that Marie has a hot temper and fears bringing up his relationships in the previous life. She often makes references to the famous quote, "Let them eat cake".

Lis was formerly Mitsuhide, who met his own end shortly after Nobunaga. He finds himself reborn as a chipmunk under the care of Mitsu whom he took a liking to due to the resemblance he has to his past life and love of milk. He fears that Nobunaga still spites him over the betrayal at Honnoji. It is later revealed that Nobunaga's killers only used his bellflower crest, but Mitsuhide himself was not actually a part of the rebellion.

Nobunaga's scribe, who was obsessed with glorifying his lord with all sorts of fictional exploits such as the destruction of Hieiyama, which ironically led to the cruel and demonic perception of the lord. He was first reborn as a cow from the Ota ranch but ended up getting killed, with his meat finding its way to Nobunaga and the other lords. Nobunaga personally described Gyuichi as a stalker in their previous lives. It eventually becomes a running gag for him to be reincarnated as a different animal, only to die once again.

Mitsu's childhood friend, who is often called by the Mitsu family to help out with Mitsuhide's household chores. His name is a reference to the Hongan-ji monks that resisted Nobunaga bitterly during his rise to power, and Nobunaga becomes completely aggressive against Tokiyoshi.

Ichiko's father who is a businessman who loves playing golf.

Media

Manga

Anime
An anime television series adaptation was announced on the sixth volume of the manga on July 19, 2019. The series is animated by Studio Signpost and directed by Hidetoshi Takahashi, with Maruo Kyōzuka handling series composition, and Hisashi Kagawa designing the characters. It premiered from January 10 to March 27, 2020 on TV Tokyo, TVO, and TVA. Akane Kumada performed the series' opening theme song "Sunny Sunny Girl◎", while Kenyu Horiuchi and Toshio Furukawa performed the series' ending theme song "Cinnamon-tachi". Crunchyroll is streaming the series.  It ran for 12 episodes.

Reception
Anime News Network had four editors review the first episode of the anime: James Beckett was initially on board with the show's concept but felt the jokes were too obvious and catered only to Japanese history aficionados, and its use of "noticeably cheap artwork and corny vocal performances" made it feel like a short-form series but is instead an "achingly repetitive" full-length one; Theron Martin commended the use of Nobunaga and other Sengoku-era figures as reincarnated canines through good "artistic effort" and decently comedic scenarios; Nick Creamer was critical of the show's overarching joke being stretched throughout its runtime and having "no real aesthetic strengths" to distinguish itself, concluding that: "If you've seen the trailer, you've seen the entire show; feel free to skip this one." The fourth reviewer, Rebecca Silverman, saw promise in the overall concept with its juxtaposition of dogs having elderly voices and side-by-side comparisons with their human forms, but felt it lacked enough "humor power" to justify its full-length running time.

Notes

References

External links
 

Anime series based on manga
Animated television series about dogs
Japanese webcomics
Seinen manga
Studio Signpost
Tokuma Shoten manga
TV Tokyo original programming
Webcomics in print
Comics about dogs
Cultural depictions of Oda Nobunaga
Fiction about reincarnation
Cultural depictions of Akechi Mitsuhide
Cultural depictions of Marie Antoinette